The 701st Aviation Brigade (Serbo-Croatian: 701.  / 701. авијацијска бригада) was an aviation brigade established in 1988 as part of the SFR Yugoslav Air Force. The brigade command was stationed at Tuzla Air Base until it was disbanded in 1990.

History
 
The 701st Aviation Brigade was formed on August 15, 1988, with command at Tuzla Air Base as part of 1st Corps of Air Force and Air Defense. After its formation, the brigade consisted of 245th and 252nd Fighter-Bomber Aviation Squadrons based at Mostar and Batajnica Air Bases and 350th Reconnaissance Aviation Squadron from Tuzla. The formation of brigade was not completed, and  two new helicopter squadrons, 721st Anti-Armored Helicopter Squadron and 792nd Transport Helicopter Squadron were planned to be formed as part of brigade, while 462nd Light Combat Aviation Squadron had to become 253rd Fighter-Bomber Aviation Squadron. The brigade was supposed to continue the tradition of 554th Assault Aviation Regiment. Further development of the brigade has been suspended and it was disbanded in July 1990.

Assignments
1st Corps of Air Force and Air Defense (1988–1990)

Structure
701st Aviation Brigade
245th Fighter-Bomber Aviation Squadron
252nd Fighter-Bomber Aviation Squadron
350th Reconnaissance Aviation Squadron

Commanding officers

Equipment
G-2 Galeb
G-4 Super Galeb
J-21 Jastreb
IJ-21 Jastreb
INJ-22 Orao
Utva 66

References

Brigades of Yugoslav Air Force
Military units and formations established in 1988
Military units and formations disestablished in 1990